Luís Miguel Brito Garcia Monteiro  (born 4 January 1980), simply known as Miguel, is a former Portuguese professional footballer who played mainly as a right-back or a winger.

He spent the vast majority of his career with Benfica (five seasons) and Valencia (seven), appearing in 200 official matches for both clubs and winning a total of four major titles.

Miguel earned 59 caps for Portugal in the 2000s and represented the country at two World Cups and as many European Championships.

Club career

Early years and Benfica
Born in Lisbon, Miguel started his career with local C.F. Estrela da Amadora as a winger. On 30 April 1999, he made his first-team debut by playing 17 minutes in a 1–2 away loss against Boavista FC, then added 28 Primeira Liga appearances in his only full season as the capital club retained its top-division status.

Miguel moved to S.L. Benfica in summer 2000, making the transition to right midfielder and then right back (by the hand of former Benfica player Fernando Chalana, in his only game as a transition coach) – the position that ultimately brought him international recognition. In the 2004–05 campaign, he contributed with 22 matches and two goals to a national championship conquest after an 11-year wait.

Valencia
Miguel joined Valencia CF in August 2005, for a €7.5 million fee. Fully established as first choice, he signed a new five-year deal in September 2007, and helped the Che win the Copa del Rey the following year, playing in the final 3–1 win against Getafe CF.

In 2009–10, Miguel was challenged by new signing Bruno, but still appeared in 25 matches as Valencia finished third and returned to the UEFA Champions League.

In May 2012, Miguel's contract expired and he was released. In 2014, he started practising with the SJPF (syndicate of professional football players) alongside other unemployed players to regain fitness.

International career
A Portugal international since making his debut against Italy on 12 February 2003, Miguel was a member of the squad when the country hosted UEFA Euro 2004. Initially a backup to Paulo Ferreira, coach Luiz Felipe Scolari made him the starting right-back in a reorganised defence after a 2–1 loss to Greece in the opening game; he withdrew injured in the first half of the final, a 0–1 defeat to the same team.

At the 2006 FIFA World Cup, he started every match before going off with an injury in the 1–0 semi-final loss to France, while at Euro 2008 he backed up José Bosingwa, and only appeared in the 0–2 group stage loss to co-hosts Switzerland.

Picked for the 2010 World Cup in South Africa – in spite of an irregular season at Valencia – Miguel was one of three right backs used during Portugal's four games in the competition, appearing in the group stage 7–0 win over North Korea. On 9 September 2010, the 30-year-old announced his retirement from international duty.

Career statistics

Club

?Information not available

International goal

Honours

Club
Benfica
Primeira Liga: 2004–05
Taça de Portugal: 2003–04
Supertaça Cândido de Oliveira: 2005

Valencia
Copa del Rey: 2007–08

International
Portugal
UEFA European Championship runner-up: 2004

Portugal Under-18
UEFA European Under-19 Championship: 1999

Orders
 Medal of Merit, Order of the Immaculate Conception of Vila Viçosa (House of Braganza)

References

External links

PortuGOAL profile

CiberChe biography and stats 

1980 births
Living people
Portuguese people of Bissau-Guinean descent
Portuguese people of Cape Verdean descent
Footballers from Lisbon
Portuguese footballers
Association football defenders
Association football midfielders
Primeira Liga players
Segunda Divisão players
C.F. Estrela da Amadora players
S.L. Benfica footballers
S.L. Benfica B players
La Liga players
Valencia CF players
Portugal youth international footballers
Portugal under-21 international footballers
Portugal international footballers
UEFA Euro 2004 players
2006 FIFA World Cup players
UEFA Euro 2008 players
2010 FIFA World Cup players
Portuguese expatriate footballers
Expatriate footballers in Spain
Portuguese expatriate sportspeople in Spain